Mong Kok District was one of the districts of Hong Kong, covering the areas of Mong Kok and Tai Kok Tsui in Kowloon. In 1994, the district was merged with Yau Tsim District, which covered Tsim Sha Tsui, Tsim Sha Tsui East, Yau Ma Tei, King's Park and Kwun Chung), to form Yau Tsim Mong District.

Mong Kok District had one of the highest population densities in the world, as it once attained 130,000 people per square kilometre. As the district was smaller than 1 km2, the actual population never reached the raw figure.  Mong Kok was the smallest district with the highest population density in Hong Kong.

Yau Tsim Mong District
Mong Kok
History of Hong Kong